Goldsmith Channel is a waterway in the Canadian territory of Nunavut connecting Parry Channel and M'Clintock Channel. Broadest in the northwest, the island-filled channel narrows as it progresses to the southeast where it separates northeastern Victoria Island's Storkerson Peninsula from western Stefansson Island by a few hundred meters of shallow water. This is an uninhabited, extremely remote area. Elvira Island is located at the head of the channel.

References

Channels of Kitikmeot Region
Victoria Island (Canada)